Giant chiton is a common name for several chitons and may refer to:

Cryptochiton stelleri, native to the North Pacific ocean
Dinoplax gigas, native to coastal South Africa
Plaxiphora obtecta, endemic to New Zealand

Chitons